Andrew Wilson is an American basketball coach and former college basketball player. He is the head men's basketball coach at Virginia Military Institute.

High school playing career
Wilson played high school basketball at Harrison High School  in Kennesaw, Georgia. He graduated as the all-time leading scorer in the school's history, and was a two-time first team all-state honoree.

He was elected to the Harrison High School Hall of Fame in 2015.

College playing career
Wilson played parts of six seasons for Leonard Hamilton at Florida State after receiving two medical redshirts for multiple injuries during his career. He captained the Seminoles during his senior season, and led the Seminoles to their first 20-win season in nine years, while also finished second in the country in three-point FG%.

At the end of his Florida State career, Wilson held records for best three-point FG% in a season, and most games played in a career.

Coaching career
After graduating from Florida State, Wilson joined Bobby Cremins' staff at College of Charleston as an assistant coach. Following a one-year stint at Binghamton, Wilson joined the head coaching staff at Georgia Southern, reuniting with another assistant from College of Charleston, Mark Byington. In 2020, after Byington was hired as the head coach at James Madison, Wilson was hired to join his staff in Harrisonburg.

On April 11, 2022, Wilson was named the new head coach at VMI, his first head coaching position.

Head coaching record

References

Living people
American men's basketball players
Binghamton Bearcats men's basketball coaches
College men's basketball head coaches in the United States
College of Charleston Cougars men's basketball coaches
Florida State Seminoles men's basketball players
Georgia Southern Eagles men's basketball coaches
James Madison Dukes men's basketball coaches
VMI Keydets basketball coaches
Year of birth missing (living people)